The Diligent: A Voyage Through the Worlds of the Slave Trade is a 2002 book by Robert W. Harms in which he offers a history of slave trade from 1731 onward.
It is a winner of the Frederick Douglass Prize, the J. Russell Major Prize, the Mark Lynton History Prize and the Gustav Ranis International Book Prize.

References 

2002 non-fiction books
Non-fiction books about slavery
Basic Books books